The Envision Racing Formula E Team is a British motor racing team based at Silverstone Park and majority-owned by Chinese wind turbine manufacturer Envision Energy that competes in Formula E.

Currently, the two drivers are Nick Cassidy and Sébastien Buemi.

History 
Virgin was one of the first teams to enter Formula E, its entry was officially confirmed in December 2013. Virgin partnered with Peugeot but rebadged as DS Automobiles from the 2015–16 season to the 2017–18 season, competing as DS Virgin Racing during that time. With DS moving its support to rival team Techeetah from the 2018–19 season onwards, Virgin chose to establish a long-term customer car deal with Audi Sport.

2014–15 season
The team signed drivers Jaime Alguersuari and Sam Bird for its inaugural season. Bird scored three podiums (two of which were wins), which was enough for a fifth place in the Drivers' Championship. For the final round in London, which was a double-header event, the team replaced Alguersuari with Fabio Leimer. Virgin would finish fifth in Teams' Championship with 133 points.

2015–16 season
For its second season, Virgin confirmed Sam Bird and Jean-Éric Vergne, who moved to the team from Andretti Autosport. It was the first season in partnership with Peugeot but rebadged as DS Performance. The season was fairly successful, as the team recorded four pole positions (three with Bird, one with Vergne). The team finished third in Teams' Championship with 144 points.

2016–17 season
For the 2016–17 season, Virgin signed José María López to partner Bird who stayed in the team. López was forced to miss the New York City ePrix due to his commitments in the FIA WEC series. For this event, he was temporarily replaced by Alex Lynn. Lynn retired from both races, but scored a pole position on his debut. Bird, on the other hand, won both of these races. Lynn was later signed to the team for the next season as a full-time driver. López returned to finish the season at the Montreal ePrix and finished his last race with the team on a podium as he finished third.

Virgin improved their points score to 190 points, but it was only enough for a fourth place in Teams' Championship.

2017–18 season

Virgin fielded Bird and the returning Alex Lynn for its fourth season. Bird was in contention for the Drivers' Championship as the main rival for Jean-Éric Vergne (who competed for Techeetah at the time), however, he got overtaken by Lucas di Grassi in the final weekend of the season in New York City, thus finished third. Lynn was unable to keep up with Bird for the entire campaign and was not kept for the next season.

Virgin would finish third in Teams' Championship with 160 points. This season would mark the end of the partnership with DS.

2018–19 season
For the 2018–19 season, as Peugeot-DS ended their partnership with the team, Virgin opted to become a customer team by switching to Audi powertrains. This move allowed the team to sign Robin Frijns, an Audi factory driver, as Bird's teammate. The team also signed a sponsorship deal with Chinese wind turbine manufacturer Envision Energy, leading to the team rebrand to Envision Virgin Racing.

The Audi e-tron FE05 powertrain proved to be very competitive, giving Virgin a chance at multiple strong results. The team would finish third in Teams' Championship with 191 points, just a point ahead of Nissan e.dams. Both Bird and Frijns would find themselves at the top of the Drivers' Championship at various points during the season, but only finished ninth and fourth respectively.

2019–20 season
Bird and Frijns were retained for the 2019–20 season along with the Audi customer deal. Bird won the 2019 Diriyah ePrix and got a podium in Race 1 of the 2020 Berlin ePrix. Frijns had a poor start until the season stopped due to the COVID-19 pandemic. He then scored two podiums at Race 3 and 5 of the Berlin ePrix. Bird and Frijns finished 10th and 12th respectively that season and Envision Virgin finished 4th in the Teams’ Championship.

2020–21 season

After six seasons with the outfit, Bird left Virgin to join Jaguar Racing. In July 2020, the team announced reigning Super Formula champion Nick Cassidy would partner Frijns for the 2020–21 season.

2021–22 season
Following the 2020–21 season Virgin left the team as a partner and the team re-branded as Envision Racing, and introduced a new green livery for its entry. Cassidy and Frijns were retained as drivers, while Alice Powell became the Simulator and Development Driver for the team.

Results 

Notes
  – In the inaugural season, all teams were supplied with a spec powertrain by McLaren.
  – Powertrain developed by DS Performance, branded as Virgin.
  – Driver was fastest in group qualifying stage and was given one championship point.

Notes

References

External links 

 
 

Racing Formula E team
British auto racing teams
2013 establishments in the United Kingdom
Auto racing teams established in 2013
Formula E teams